Gregory Mulamba (born 31 August 1986) is a South African soccer player who played for Austin Aztex in the USL.

Career

Amateur
Mulamba enjoyed a seven-year spell with USL PDL side Laredo Heat from 2007 to 2014.

Professional
Mulamba signed his first professional contract with United Soccer League side Austin Aztex in January 2015, before been loaned out to league rivals Oklahoma City Energy in March 2015.

References

External links
OKC Energy bio
Austin Aztex bio

1986 births
Living people
Laredo Heat players
Austin Aztex players
OKC Energy FC players
Association football midfielders
USL League Two players
USL Championship players
South African soccer players
South African expatriate soccer players
Expatriate soccer players in the United States